Dorian Hauterville (born 27 April 1990) is a French bobsledder. He competed in the two-man event at the 2018 Winter Olympics. Born in Lyon, he is of Guadeloupean descent.

References

External links
 

1990 births
Living people
French male bobsledders
Olympic bobsledders of France
Bobsledders at the 2018 Winter Olympics
Bobsledders at the 2022 Winter Olympics
Place of birth missing (living people)
Black French sportspeople
French people of Guadeloupean descent